Henrique Arlindo Etges (born 15 March 1966) is a former Brazilian footballer.

Club statistics

References

External links

1966 births
Living people
Brazilian footballers
Brazilian expatriate footballers
Brazil under-20 international footballers
Brazil international footballers
J1 League players
Grêmio Foot-Ball Porto Alegrense players
Associação Portuguesa de Desportos players
União São João Esporte Clube players
Sport Club Corinthians Paulista players
Tokyo Verdy players
Expatriate footballers in Japan
Association football defenders